Giovanni Rossetti (29 May 1919 – 16 September 1987) was an Italian professional footballer, who played as a goalkeeper.

Club career
Throughout his club career, Rossetti played for Italian sides Milan and Arsenaltaranto. With 180 appearances for Milan, he is the club's eighth-most capped keeper of all time, behind only Christian Abbiati (380), Sebastiano Rossi (330), Dida (302), Lorenzo Buffon (300), Enrico Albertosi (233), Dario Compiani (221), and Fabio Cudicini (183).

References

External links 
Profile at MagliaRossonera.it 

1919 births
1987 deaths
Italian footballers
Association football goalkeepers
Serie A players
A.C. Milan players
Taranto F.C. 1927 players